Land diving (known in the local Sa language as  and in Bislama as ) is a ritual performed by the men of the southern part of Pentecost Island, Vanuatu. Land diving is done by tying vines to each ankle. The tradition has developed into a tourist attraction. According to the Guinness World Records, the g-force experienced by those at their lowest point in the dive is the greatest experienced in the non-industrialized world by humans.

Background

The origin of land diving is described in a legend of a woman who was dissatisfied with her husband, Tamalie (or some variation of the name). It is sometimes claimed that the woman was upset that her husband was too vigorous regarding his sexual wants, so she ran away into the forest. Her husband followed her, so she climbed a banyan tree. Tamalie climbed after her, and so she tied lianas to her ankles and jumped and survived. Her husband jumped after her, but did not tie lianas to himself, which caused him to plummet and die. Originally, women did it in respect to the original woman who did it, but husbands were not comfortable with seeing their wives in such positions, so they took the sport for themselves, and it gradually changed from trees to specifically designed wooden towers. The men performed the original land diving so that they would not be tricked again.

The land diving ritual is associated with the annual yam harvest. It is performed annually in the months of April, May, or June. A good dive helps ensure a bountiful yam harvest.

The villagers believe land diving can enhance the health and strength of the divers. A successful dive can remove the illnesses and physical problems associated with the wet season. Furthermore, land diving is considered as an expression of masculinity, as it demonstrates boldness that was associated with the bwahri or warrior. Nevertheless, the men who do not choose to dive or back out of diving are not humiliated as cowards.

In the Sa language,  refers to both the tower and the land dive. The tower symbolically represents a body, with a head, shoulders, breasts, belly, genitals, and knees. The diving platforms represent the penises and the struts beneath represent the vaginas.

Preparation

The time of yam harvest is significant because tower construction is best done during the dry season. Also, the lianas have the best elasticity during this time. During the period of preparation for nanggol, the men seclude themselves from the women and refrain from sex. Furthermore, women are not allowed to go near the tower or else Tamalie, who lives in the tower, may seek vengeance, leading to the death of a diver. Additionally, the men must not wear any lucky charms during the dive.

The construction of the tower typically takes between two and five weeks. Around twenty to thirty men help construct it. The men cut trees to construct the body, clear a site for the tower, and remove rocks from the soil. The soil is tilled to soften the ground. The wood is freshly cut, so that it can remain strong. The core of the tower is made from a lopped tree, and a pole scaffolding tied together with vines stabilizing it. Several platforms come out about two meters from the front of the tower, supported by several struts. The lowest platform is around 10 meters, and the highest platform is near the top. During the jump, the platform supports snap, causing the platform to hinge downward and absorb some of the force from falling.

The vines are selected by a village elder and matched with each jumper's weight without any mechanical calculations. The vines need to be supple, elastic, and full of sap in order to be safe. The ends of the vines are shredded to allow the fibres to be looped around the ankles of the jumpers. If the vine is too long, the diver can hit the ground hard, but if the vine is too short, then the diver can collide with the tower.

Before diving, the men often bring closure to unsettled business and disputes in case they die. The night before the jump, divers sleep beneath the tower to ward off evil spirits.

Ritual

Though the majority of the islanders are Christian, they also adhere to the ancient beliefs. Before dawn on the day of the ceremony, the men undergo a ritual wash, anoint coconut oil on themselves, and decorate their bodies. The males wear boar tusks around their necks. The men wear traditional nambas, and the women wear traditional grass dresses and are bare-breasted. Only the men are allowed to dive, but the dancing women provide mental support. Around 10 to 20 men in a village will jump.

The ritual begins with the least experienced jumpers on the lower platforms and ends with the most experienced jumpers on the upper platforms. The ideal jump is high with the jumper landing close to the ground. The goal is to brush the shoulders against the ground. The higher the jump, the more bountiful the harvest. Before diving, the jumper can give speeches, sing songs, and make pantomimes.

The diver crosses his arms over his chest to help prevent injury to the arms. The head is tucked in so his shoulders can contact the ground. Therefore, the divers risk a number of injuries, such as a broken neck or a concussion. Right after a dive, other villagers rush in and take care of the diver.

For boys, land diving is a rite of passage. After the boys are circumcised at the age of around seven to eight, the boys can participate in the ritual. When a boy is ready to become a man, he land dives in the presence of his elders. His mother holds a favourite childhood item, for example, a piece of cloth. After completing the dive, the item is thrown away, demonstrating that the boy has become a man.

Modern history
In the mid-nineteenth century, missionaries came to the area and persuaded the natives to stop land diving. In the 1970s, anti-colonialism caused land diving to be seen in a new light as way to demonstrate their cultural identity. After the independence from colonial powers in 1980, the ritual was revived by Christian locals from neighbouring areas. In 1995, the people of Pentecost Island, with the support of Vanuatu's attorney-general, declared that they would endeavor to get royalties from bungee jumping enterprises because they viewed the tradition as stolen.

Notable dives

Dive for French resident commissioner
In 1952, a land dive was performed for a French resident commissioner. British and French troops attacked some villages based on the rumor of a developing cargo cult. Several older men were arrested, though their sons offered to take their place. The men were let go in return for a land dive performance for the French resident commissioner. During the demonstration, the villagers sang a chant in Sa, incomprehensible to the resident commissioner, which noted the irony that the white resident commissioner thought he was strong, whereas it was the native men who were jumping from the towers.

Queen Elizabeth II incident
In 1974, Queen Elizabeth II of Great Britain visited Vanuatu and observed the spectacle. The British colonial administration wanted The Queen to have an interesting tour, and convinced the Anglican villagers of the Melanesian Mission at Point Cross to perform a jump. However, the vines were not elastic enough because it was the wrong season, the middle of the wet season. One diver had both lianas broken, broke his back from falling, and later died in a hospital.

Kal Müller
Kal Müller, a journalist, is the first white man to land dive. Müller waited two years for the villagers of Bunlap to invite him to jump. Before the jump, he spent seven months with the villagers. His experiences were recounted in the December 1970 edition of National Geographic Magazine, Land Diving With the Pentecost Islanders.

Karl Pilkington
Karl Pilkington was supposed to jump from the highest bar for his television program, An Idiot Abroad, as he had refused to bungee jump in New Zealand. However, he jumped only from the lowest bar after the natives agreed that it was a legitimate land dive.

Tourism

Land diving has become a tourist attraction for the villagers. The tourism aspect of land diving has come with some debate, such as maintaining the custom's integrity while gaining attention. To prevent commercialization of land diving, a tourism council that handles the tourists and presentation was formed by the chiefs. The tourism office works with tour companies and provides revenue by bringing in foreigners. The local control and government support maintain the ritual's authenticity, while encouraging promotion. In 1982, tourists paid 35 pounds per person to watch the event. Tourists watching the land-diving today typically pay 10,000–12,000 vatu per person (around $100–120). Though it was an annual event, land diving now occurs weekly from April to June because of its profitability. Some tourists want to try land diving themselves, but are often denied for fear of safety. In 2006, commercial filming of the ritual was banned by the Vanuatu Cultural Centre to protect the culture.

See also
Bungee jumping

References

Further reading

External links
 Land Diving on Pentecost Island, Vanuatu
 Award winning photo documentary by Michael Craig

Vanuatuan culture
Rites of passage
Bungee jumping